Aguinaldo Silva  (Carpina, 7 June 1943) is a Brazilian Emmy-winning telenovela writer born in Carpina, Brazil.

Filmography

Television

References

External links 
 
 
 Aguinaldo Silva at the Memória Globo

1943 births
Living people
Authors of Brazilian telenovelas
People from Pernambuco
Brazilian male dramatists and playwrights
Brazilian male novelists
Male television writers
Brazilian LGBT screenwriters
Brazilian LGBT dramatists and playwrights
20th-century Brazilian dramatists and playwrights
20th-century Brazilian novelists
20th-century Brazilian male writers
21st-century Brazilian dramatists and playwrights
21st-century Brazilian novelists
21st-century Brazilian male writers
Brazilian LGBT novelists
21st-century Brazilian LGBT people